Jelena Mišić is a Yugoslav-Canadian computer scientist specializing in wireless networking, mobile computing, cloud computing, blockchain-based data recording, and cryptocurrency. She is a professor of computer science at Toronto Metropolitan University. She received her PhD in computer engineering from University of Belgrade in 1986.

Before joining Ryerson University (now Toronto Metropolitan University), she was with University of Manitoba and Hong Kong University of Science and Technology. She has authored or coauthored four books and more than 300 papers in journals and conference proceedings in the area of computer networks and security. In 2018, she was elected Fellow of the Institute of Electrical and Electronics Engineers "for contributions to modeling and performance evaluation in wireless communications."

References

External links
Home page

Fellow Members of the IEEE
Serbian women engineers
Academic staff of Toronto Metropolitan University
University of Belgrade alumni
Academic staff of the University of Manitoba
Academic staff of the Hong Kong University of Science and Technology
Living people
Year of birth missing (living people)
Place of birth missing (living people)